Alberto Antonio Cabrera (born October 25, 1988) is an American former professional baseball pitcher. He previously played for the Chicago Cubs.

Career

Chicago Cubs
Cabrera had his contract selected on November 19, 2010. Cabrera was recalled from the Triple-A Iowa Cubs on August 1, 2012. He made his Major League debut against the Pittsburgh Pirates on August 1, 2012. Cabrera was designated for assignment on March 30. 2014.

Detroit Tigers
On December 5, 2014, Cabrera signed a minor league contract with the Detroit Tigers. He elected free agency on November 6, 2015.

Personal
His brother, Mauricio Cabrera, played baseball professionally for the Atlanta Braves.

References

External links

1988 births
Living people
Boise Hawks players
Chicago Cubs players
Daytona Cubs players
Iowa Cubs players
Major League Baseball pitchers
Peoria Chiefs players
Tennessee Smokies players
Dominican Summer League Cubs players
Toros del Este players
Toledo Mud Hens players
Erie SeaWolves players
People from San Juan Province (Dominican Republic)